Ramesh Rajaram Powar  (born 20 May 1978) is a former Indian cricketer.

Powar was selected in 2000 for the first intake of the National Cricket Academy in Bangalore. and again he was named as India women's cricket team coach in 2021 month of June.

Powar's term will include a tour to Sri Lanka, a bilateral series in the West Indies in October followed by the ICC Women's World T20 in West Indies in November.

"The BCCI has appointed Mr. Ramesh Powar as Head Coach of the Indian Women’s Team. Mr. Powar has now been handed over full time duties till 30th November, 2018," the board's secretary Amitabh Choudhary said in a statement.

Playing career 

Powar was a consistent performer in domestic cricket for many seasons and was crucial to Mumbai cricket team's Ranji Trophy success in the 2002–03 season. Powar played first class cricket for 16 years

Powar played for Sefton Park in the Liverpool and District Cricket Competition, signed as a late replacement for the injured Vinayak Mane in July 2005. He scored 325 league runs at 32.5 in ten games and took 25 wickets at 21 apiece.

He was first selected in the Indian squad for their tour of Pakistan. He did not return to the ODI side again until early 2006. His recall came on the back of 63 domestic wickets for 2005–06. It was the second season in a row that he had taken over 50 wickets.

However, in January 2007, he was dropped from the squad because of injury and Anil Kumble returned as the second spinner in the lead up to the 2007 Cricket World Cup. But his poor fielding skills paved the way for his exclusion from the Indian team.

In May 2008, he made his IPL debut for the Kings XI Punjab and picked up a wicket in the very first over he bowled. He represented Kings XI Punjab in the first three seasons of the IPL. He represented the defunct Kochi Tuskers Kerala franchise in the IPL in 2011. He played for Kings XI Punjab in 2012.

In 2013, after representing Mumbai cricket team for 14 first-class seasons he shifted to Rajasthan cricket team where he had a poor season. He took 10 wickets at 62.20 from six matches. But in 2014, Powar became the first player of Rajasthan cricket team to move out as Rajasthan Cricket Association was suspended by BCCI. He joined Gujarat cricket team for next season.

In November 2015, Powar announced that he would retire from all forms of cricket following the conclusion of the 2015–16 Ranji Trophy.

He has been appointed as the head coach of India women's cricket team on an interim basis. As per a report in The Indian Express, the Board of Control for Cricket in India (BCCI) has asked him to oversee the camp to be held in Bengaluru from 25 July to 3 August. In February 2021, he was appointed as Mumbai team's head coach for the Vijay Hazare Trophy. Ramesh Powar appointed as the head coach of the Indian women's cricket team. The cricket governing body released an official statement in this regard.

Personal life 

He is an alumnus of Ruparel College of Science, Commerce and Arts in Matunga, Mumbai. His brother Kiran Powar also played cricket and is current under-19s coach of Vidarbha cricket team.

Controversies 
In 2018 Women World Cup, Ramesh got into a dispute with batter Mithali Raj, and as a consequence of that she was not allowed to play in the semifinal. Many fans of the Indian team cited this incident as the reason for the team's poor showing at the World  Cup.

References

External links
 
 Ramesh Powar featured in the 5 best players of India's domestic season 2005–2006.

1978 births
Living people
Indian cricketers
India One Day International cricketers
India Test cricketers
Mumbai cricketers
Punjab Kings cricketers
Kochi Tuskers Kerala cricketers
West Zone cricketers
India Red cricketers
India Blue cricketers
Indian cricket coaches